James H. Denison (March 3, 1812 – February 6, 1873) was a justice of the Supreme Court of Texas from January 1870 to July 1870.

Little is known of Denison, who was "appointed an associate justice of the Texas Supreme Court by military authority during the turbulent Reconstruction era. Denison served on the court for several months from January 22, 1870 until July 5, 1870".

References

Justices of the Texas Supreme Court
1812 births
1873 deaths
19th-century American judges